The 2019–20 Austrian Cup was the 89th edition of the national cup in Austrian football. The champions of the cup earn a place in the 2020–21 Europa League group stage.

Red Bull Salzburg were the defending champions after winning the competition in the previous season by defeating Rapid Wien in the final.
Times up to 26 October 2019 and from 29 March 2020 are CEST (UTC+2), and times from 27 October 2019 to 28 March 2020 are CET (UTC+1).

First round 
Thirty–two first round matches were played between 19 and 21 July 2019.

Second round 
Sixteen second round matches were played between 24 and 25 September 2019.

Third round 
Eight third round matches were played between 29 and 30 October 2019.

Quarter-finals 
The quarter-final matches were played between 7 and 9 February 2020.

Semi-finals
The semi-final matches were played on 4 and 5 March 2020.

Final

Top goalscorers

See also 
 2019–20 Austrian Football Bundesliga

References

External links 
  soccerway.com

Austrian Cup seasons
Cup
Austrian Cup
Austrian Cup